Jean-Claude Germain (born 18 June 1939 in Montreal) is a Canadian playwright, author, journalist and historian.

He contributed to Le Petit Journal, to Victor-Lévy Beaulieu's Dimensions magazine and to Maclean's Magazine, and has been the senior editor to Le Québec littéraire. He writes a monthly column in l'aut'journal.

In 1969 he founded the company Le Théâtre du Même Nom which became the Théâtre d'Aujourd'hui of which he became the director in 1972. He has also taught at the National Theatre School of Canada.

Published works
Le roi des mises à bas prix (1972)
Diguidi, diguidi, ha! ha! ha! Si les Sansoucis s'en soucient, ces Sansoucis-ci s'en soucieront-ils? Bien parler, c'est se respecter! (1972)
Les tourtereaux : ou, La vieillesse frappe à l'aube (1974)
Les sportifs et le droit (1975)
Les hauts et les bas de la vie d' une diva Sarah Ménard par aux-mêmes : une monologuerie bouffe (1976)
Un pays dont la devise est je m'oublie : théâtre (1976)
Les faux brillants de Félix-Gabriel Marchand : paraphrase (1977)
Seguro dos desportistas contra os riscos de acidentes (1978)
L'école des rêves : théâtre (1979)
Mamours et conjugat : scènes de la vie amoureuse québécoise : théâtre (1979)
Les nuits de l'Indiva : une mascapade (1983)
A Canadian play/une plaie canadienne : théâtre (1983)
Le Feuilleton de Montréal (1994)
Le miroir aux tartuffes : un charivari québécois : théâtre (1998)
De tous les plaisirs, lire est le plus fou (2001)
Rue Fabre, centre de l'univers : historiettes de mon jeune âge (2007)

Awards
2001: Order of La Pléiade

External links
Agence Goodwin - Jean-Claude Germain

1939 births
20th-century Canadian dramatists and playwrights
21st-century Canadian dramatists and playwrights
Journalists from Montreal
Writers from Montreal
Historians from Quebec
Living people
Canadian dramatists and playwrights in French
Canadian male dramatists and playwrights
20th-century Canadian male writers
21st-century Canadian male writers
Canadian male non-fiction writers